All Saints' College, founded in 1857 in Galle, Sri Lanka, is located in a Dutch fortress in a residential suburb of Galle known as the Galle Fort, on Light House Street. The fortress is a UNESCO World Heritage Site. With a history spanning over 160 years it has been able to gain many achievements of excellence both in the academic and non academic fields. 

All Saints' College began as an educational institution in 1857, under the patronage of Lord Peter and the Anglican Church, with a total of 137 students in the roll. Some reliable chronicles testify that the college was initially launched for the purpose of educating the children of the Dutch trading community.

History 
Notwithstanding the annexing of modern buildings in the recent times, some antique constructions blended with the Dutch architecture still exist with the school premises.
During the Second World War the school was moved to Justin mountain. Not much information can be gathered about the school during this period.
Till 1959 the school had been controlled by Diogison educational committee. There were 392 pupils in 1953, 412 pupils in 1958, 565 pupils in 1960 and 746 pupils in 1966. The schools was controlled by the government from 1959, being known as Galle central college, its principal being Mr. E.P. Silva from 1953.

College Moto 
“අත්තාහි අත්තනෝ නාථෝ“, "Atta’hi attano natho", "One is the master of oneself".
This is an excerpt from stanza no. 168 of the Dhammapada. It appears in the Atta Vagga of the Dhammapada, as its 4th verse.

Houses 
Students are divided into Four houses. 

Aura - 
Alto - 
Aqua - 
Ally - 

From 1857 to 1960’s four Houses were Named as Ttitly, Leefy, Hardy and Eerskin

References

External links

 Galle School Directory
 All Saints' College Facebook Community
 All Saints' College Official Web site
 Galle Municipal Council
 A Historic tour through the city of Galle
 The old world's romantic city: Galle!
 Galle - A Port City in History
 Official web site
 Official Old Boys Association web site
 web site

Schools in Galle
Educational institutions established in 1867
Provincial schools in Sri Lanka
1867 establishments in Ceylon